Culture III is the fourth and final studio album by American hip hop trio Migos. It was released by Motown Records and Quality Control Music on June 11, 2021. The album features guest appearances from Drake, Cardi B, Polo G, Future, Justin Bieber, Juice Wrld, Pop Smoke, and YoungBoy Never Broke Again. It is the follow-up to their 2018 album Culture II and serves as the conclusion to their Culture trilogy. A deluxe edition was released six days later, including five additional tracks.

Culture III was supported by two singles: "Need It" and "Straightenin", as well as the promotional single, "Avalanche". The album received generally positive reviews from critics and debuted at number two on the US Billboard 200.

Background and release
In October 2018, Quavo stated in an interview with the Associated Press that following his own recently released solo album Quavo Huncho, first Takeoff and then Offset would release solo efforts. When questioned on when new Migos music would arrive, he replied that Culture III would arrive "at the top of 2019", along with suggesting that a collaborative project between Migos and Canadian rapper Drake would be released after their touring together. On March 25, 2019, Takeoff stated that the album was on the way. On December 12, 2019, Offset revealed the album would be the last chapter in the Culture trilogy and that it included a song with late American rapper Juice Wrld titled "What's Brackin", only four days after Juice Wrld passed away from a drug overdose.

The album was delayed and rescheduled for release in early 2020. However, the album was pushed back again, due to the COVID-19 pandemic. Quavo spoke to Billboard in March 2020, announcing the trio's decision to hold off on releasing Culture III, explaining that it was largely due to their inability to properly roll out the album once social distancing rules went into effect in most states in the United States of America. Instead, the trio stated that they would first release a different project, titled Quarantine Mixtape, in the lead-up to Culture III. On May 22, 2020, while appearing on American rapper Lil Wayne's Young Money Radio show on Apple Music, Migos announced they would change the title from Culture III to another title. No release date was announced at that time.

On April 18, 2021, Quavo tweeted that mixing of the album had begun. On May 17, 2021, Migos announced that Culture III would be released on June 11, 2021. The release date was announced through a letter that they wrote as part of Quality Control, the label that they are signed to.

Promotion

Singles
On May 22, 2020, Migos released the album's lead single, "Need It", featuring American rapper YoungBoy Never Broke Again. The song was produced by Buddah Bless. It peaked at number 62 on the Billboard Hot 100. The music video premiered on August 20, 2020.

On May 14, 2021, the trio released "Straightenin" as the second single, their first release in slightly less than a year. The song was produced by DJ Durel, Atake, Sluzyyy, Slime Castro, Nuki, and Osiris. It peaked at number 23 on the Billboard Hot 100. The music video premiered alongside the song.

Promotional singles
The album's lead promotional single, "Avalanche", was released on June 10, 2021, as well an accompanying music video. The song was produced by DJ Durel and Quavo.

Critical reception

Culture III was met with generally positive reviews. At Metacritic, which assigns a normalized rating out of 100 to reviews from professional publications, the album received an average score of 75, based on nine reviews. Aggregator AnyDecentMusic? gave it 6.6 out of 10, based on their assessment of the critical consensus.

Robin Murray of Clash praised the album, stating, "A huge undertaking, Culture 3 is marked by its dense array of sonic reference points. It's a huge record, a panoramic thriller that places three incendiary MCs against a digital orchestra – an ambitious, lavish, and extraordinarily successful release". Reviewing the album for NME, Sam Moore stated, "Culture III is more focused than its exhausting 24-track-long predecessor, but a stricter edit here could've enhanced the experience even further". Yoh Phillips from Rolling Stone enjoyed the album, saying, "Culture III surpasses the sequel, and lives up to the greatness of 2017's brilliantly concise breakthrough Culture. One could argue that every song has a different MVP". Luke Fox of Exclaim! said, "The Migos formula works, to be sure. But it's those occasional reaches outside the tried and true – be it beats or collaborators – that make for a more compelling listen, even if they don't always smack the mark". Danny Schwartz of Entertainment Weekly wrote, "It isn't a slog, but it's closer in shape and spirit to the loose bloat of Culture II than the carefully sculpted gothic trap-pop opus Culture. Still, it is a satisfying listen". Ben Brutocao of HipHopDX said, "The beats are pleasant to excellent, the raps are practiced yet dry, and the trio that has come so far finds itself not moving at all".

AllMusic critic Neil Z. Yeung said, "While the set is a bit of a chore at 19 tracks (24 on the deluxe version), it's still not as bloated as Culture II. Yet, it could use some trimming if only to clear the clutter that distracts from the solid highlights". Writing for Pitchfork, Paul A. Thompson stated, "Like its predecessor, Culture III can become a slog, and at times seems shoddily constructed, its commercial ambitions ill-considered and to the album's detriment. It's also girded by songs that recall the Migos' inspired peak—and a couple that rank among their best". In a mixed review, Slant Magazines Charles Lyons-Burt stated, "In all the excess, one is nonetheless left wanting more—better fleshed-out personas or a glint of a new stylistic direction rather than a doubling down on committee-tested beats and a formulaic approach. The end result is more diminishing returns for Migos's Culture series".

Commercial performance
Culture III debuted at number two on the US Billboard 200 chart, earning 130,000 album-equivalent units (including 22,000 copies as traditional album sales) in its first week. The album also accumulated a total of 144.57 million on-demand streams of the album's songs during that week.

Track listing

Personnel
Credits adapted from Tidal.

Migos
 Offset – rap vocals
 Quavo – rap vocals (all tracks), recording engineer (12, 13)
 Takeoff – rap vocals

Additional musicians

 DJ Durel – programming (1, 3, 9, 11, 14, 15, 23)
 Azul Wynter – programming (2)
 Beam – programming (2)
 Jack LoMastro – programming (2)
 Preme – programming (2)
 Wallis Lane – programming (2, 6)
 Drake – vocals (2)
 Atake – programming (3)
 Nuki – programming (3)
 Osiris – programming (3)
 Slime Castro – programming (3)
 Sluzyyy – programming (3)
 Shane Lindstrom – programming (4, 7, 13, 17, 20); bass, drums, piano, synthesizer (4, 13, 17); violin (13)
 Ciaga – programming (4)
 Pooh Beatz – programming (4, 5)
 Rvnes – programming (4)
 Section 8 – programming (4)
 Tay Keith – programming (4, 12)
 Cardi B – vocals (4)
 Mars – programming (5, 17); keyboards, synthesizer (17)
 Nas Moore – programming (5)
 Rasool Diaz – programming (5, 13)
 Polo G – rap vocals (5)
 OG Parker – programming (6)
 Smash David – programming (6)
 Jordan Fox – programming (7)
 Buddah Bless – programming (8, 19)
 Pvlace – programming (9)
 Future – rap vocals (9)
 Trauma Tone – programming (10)
 Zaytoven – programming (10)
 Danny Wolf – programming (11)
 Justin Bieber – vocals (11)
 Carnage – programming (12)
 Cubeatz – programming (12)
 Nils – programming (12)
 Juice Wrld – rap vocals (13)
 BGudini – programming (15)
 Oz – programming (16)
 Sonic – programming (17)
 808Melo – programming (18)
 Swirv – programming (18)
 Pop Smoke – rap vocals (18)
 YoungBoy Never Broke Again – rap vocals (19)
 Kid Hazel – programming (21)
 Will Major – programming (22)
 Squill – programming (22)
 Pyrex – programming (23)
 Dun Deal – programming (24)

Technical

 Kevin "Coach K" Lee – executive producer
 Pierre "P" Thomas – executive producer
 Michelle Mancini – mastering engineer
 Manny Marroquin – mixer
 Chris Galland – mix engineer
 Jeremie Inhaber – assistant mixer
 DJ Durel – recording engineer (1–11, 14, 15, 16–24)
 Todd Hurtt – recording engineer (5)
 Max Lord – recording engineer (10, 12), recording arranger (13)
 Elijah Marrett-Hitch – recording engineer (11)
 Josh Gudwin – vocal producer (11)
 Buster Ross – assistant recording engineer (1–6, 8–12, 14–18)
 Heidi Wang – additional engineer (11)
 Hathan Smith – assistant recording engineer (20, 21, 22, 23, 24)
 Nick van Gelder – assistant recording engineer (20, 21, 22, 23, 24)

Charts

Weekly charts

Year-end charts

Release history

References

2021 albums
Migos albums
Albums produced by DJ Durel
Albums produced by Murda Beatz
Albums produced by Wheezy
Albums produced by Zaytoven
Albums produced by Tay Keith
Albums postponed due to the COVID-19 pandemic
Sequel albums
Albums produced by Cubeatz